The politics of Beijing is structured in a dual party-government system like all other governing institutions in the mainland of the People's Republic of China.

The Mayor of Beijing is the highest-ranking official in the People's Government of Beijing. Since Beijing is a centrally administered municipality, the mayor occupies the same level in the order of precedence as provincial governors. However, in the city's dual party-government governing system, the mayor is subordinate to the Beijing Municipal Committee Secretary of the Chinese Communist Party (CCP).

The office of Beijing Party Secretary has always historically been a high-profile post. Since the founding of the People's Republic, the Party Secretary of Beijing has almost always held a seat on the Politburo of the Chinese Communist Party, the country's top ruling organ. Because of Beijing's position as the national capital, the Secretary is also involved in major decision making of national events. Peng Zhen, the first Beijing party secretary, was an important political figure nationally, and was purged by Mao in the opening act of the Cultural Revolution. Xie Fuzhi, whose term lasted from 1967 to 1972, was concurrently China's top security official, and held significant influence nationally. Chen Xitong's (term 1992-95) political influence was considered a threat to the Shanghai clique that he was removed from the position and tried on corruption charges. When the People's Republic celebrated its 50th Anniversary, it was Beijing Party Secretary Jia Qinglin (term 1997-2002) who presided over the festivities. Liu Qi (term 2002–2012) was the chair of the Beijing Organizing Committee for the Olympic Games, and spoke at both the opening and closing ceremonies of the games.

List of CCP secretaries

List of chairmen of Beijing People's Congress

List of mayors

Republic of China

People's Republic of China

List of chairmen of CPPCC Beijing Committee

List of the Chairmen of Beijing Supervisory Committee

See also

 List of current district-level leaders of Beijing
 Politics of Chongqing
 Politics of Shanghai
 Politics of Tianjin

Notes

References 

 Chinese provincial leaders

External links
 Beijing Municipality Government official website
 Beijing Municipality E-Government official website 

 
Beijing
Beijing
Beijing